Jonathan Alexis Ferrante (born 27 June 1995) is an Argentine-born Italian professional footballer who plays as a forward for  club Cesena on loan from Ternana.

Club career
He made his professional debut in the Lega Pro for Piacenza on 4 September 2011 in a game against Südtirol.

On 10 July 2019, he joined Ternana on loan. On 31 January 2020, he transferred to Ternana on a permanent basis and signed a contract until 30 June 2023. On 27 July 2021, he extended his contract with Ternana until 30 June 2024 and was loaned to Foggia for the 2021–22 season.

On 23 August 2022, Ferrante moved to Cesena on loan with an option to buy and a conditional obligation to buy.

References

External links
 

1995 births
Living people
Footballers from Buenos Aires
Italian sportspeople of Argentine descent
Argentine footballers
Italian footballers
Association football forwards
Serie B players
Serie C players
Piacenza Calcio 1919 players
A.S. Roma players
L'Aquila Calcio 1927 players
F.C. Lumezzane V.G.Z. A.S.D. players
S.S.D. Lucchese 1905 players
A.C. Savoia 1908 players
Imolese Calcio 1919 players
Abano Calcio players
Brescia Calcio players
Pisa S.C. players
Delfino Pescara 1936 players
Alma Juventus Fano 1906 players
Ternana Calcio players
Calcio Foggia 1920 players
Cesena F.C. players
Italy youth international footballers